Thamodarampillai Ramalingam (born 26 October 1904) was a Ceylon Tamil lawyer, politician and Member of Parliament.

Early life
Ramalingam was born on 26 October 1904. He was the son of R. Thamodarampillai, a proctor from Udupiddy in northern Ceylon. He was educated at the Udupiddy American Mission College. After school Ramalingam joined Ceylon University College, graduating in 1926 with a B.Sc. degree.

Career
Ramalingam joined the legal profession, practising as an advocate in northern Ceylon. He then joined the bench, serving as a magistrate.

Ramalingam contested the 1947 parliamentary election as the All Ceylon Tamil Congress's (ACTC) candidate in Point Pedro. He won the election and entered Parliament. The ACTC joined the United National Party led government on 3 September 1948. Ramalingam was made Deputy Chairman of Committees in 1951. He was re-elected at the 1952 parliamentary election.

References

1904 births
All Ceylon Tamil Congress politicians
Alumni of the Ceylon University College
Alumni of Udupiddy American Mission College
Ceylonese advocates
Deputy chairmen of committees of the Parliament of Sri Lanka
Members of the 1st Parliament of Ceylon
Members of the 2nd Parliament of Ceylon
People from Northern Province, Sri Lanka
People from British Ceylon
Year of death missing
Sri Lankan Tamil lawyers
Sri Lankan Tamil politicians